The Rio Grande water resource region is one of 21 major geographic areas, or regions, in the first level of classification used by the United States Geological Survey to divide and sub-divide the United States into successively smaller hydrologic units. These geographic areas contain either the drainage area of a major river, or the combined drainage areas of a series of rivers.

This region includes the drainage within the United States of: (a) the Rio Grande Basin, and (b) the San Luis Valley, North Plains, Plains of San Agustin, Mimbres River, Estancia, Jornada Del Muerto, Tularosa Valley, Salt Basin, and other closed basins. Includes parts of Colorado, New Mexico, and Texas.

List of water resource subregions

See also
List of rivers in the United States
Water resource region

References

Lists of drainage basins
Drainage basins
Watersheds of the United States
Regions of the United States
 Resource
Water resource regions